John Peale Bent (August 5, 1908 – June 5, 2004) was an American ice hockey player who competed in the 1932 Winter Olympics.

Early life
Bent was born in Eagles Mere, Pennsylvania. He graduated from Kent School in Kent, Connecticut in 1926 where he played on the team with fellow hockey Olympian Winthrop Palmer. Both Bent and Palmer also played hockey at Yale University prior to competing in the Olympics.

In 1932 he was a member of the American ice hockey team, which won the silver medal. He played all six matches and scored three goals.

He died in Lake Forest, Illinois.

External links

Johnny Bent sports-reference.com

1908 births
2004 deaths
American men's ice hockey forwards
Ice hockey players from Pennsylvania
Ice hockey players at the 1932 Winter Olympics
Kent School alumni
Medalists at the 1932 Winter Olympics
Olympic silver medalists for the United States in ice hockey
People from Sullivan County, Pennsylvania
Yale Bulldogs men's ice hockey players